A village is an urban municipality status type used in the Canadian province of Alberta. Alberta villages are created when communities with populations of at least 300 people, where a majority of their buildings are on parcels of land smaller than 1,850 m2, apply to Alberta Municipal Affairs for village status under the authority of the Municipal Government Act.  Applications for village status are approved via orders in council made by the Lieutenant Governor in Council under recommendation from the Minister of Municipal Affairs.

As of 2021, Alberta had 80 villages that had a cumulative population of 33,773 in the 2016 Census of Population. Alberta's largest and smallest villages are Duchess and Milo with population counts of 1,085 and 91.

When a village's population reaches or exceeds 1,000 people, the council may request a change to town status, but the change in incorporated status is not mandatory. Villages with populations less than 300, whether their populations have declined below 300 or they were incorporated as villages prior to the minimum 300 population requirement, are permitted to retain village status.

Village governance is delivered by 327 elected village officials (80 mayors and 247 councillors) throughout the province.

Administration 
Pursuant to Part 5, Division 1 of the Municipal Government Act (MGA), each municipality created under the authority of the MGA is governed by a council. As a requirement of the MGA, a village council consists of three councillors by default, one of which is the village's chief elected official (CEO) or mayor. A village council may consist of a higher number if council passes a bylaw altering its size. For the 2017–2021 term, 36 villages had a council of three, 1 had a council of four, and 44 had a council of five.

Village councils are governed by a mayor and typically an even number of councillors that are elected by popular vote, resulting in a total odd number of councillors to avoid tie votes on council matters. All council members are elected under the provisions of the Local Authorities Election Act (LAEA). Mayoral or councillor candidates are required to be residents of their municipality for a minimum of six consecutive months prior to nomination day. The last municipal election was October 16, 2017.

Alberta Municipal Affairs, a ministry of the Cabinet of Alberta, is charged with coordination of all levels of local government.

Administrative duties of villages include public safety, roads, water service, drainage and waste collection, as well as coordination of infrastructure with provincial and regional authorities (including road construction, education, and health).

List 
{| class="wikitable sortable mw-collapsible"
!Name
!Ruralmunicipality
!Incorporationdate (village)
!Municipalcensuspopulation(year)-->
!Population(2016)
!Population(2011)
!Change(%)
!Landarea(km²)
!Populationdensity(per km²)
|-
|scope="row"| Acme || Kneehill County ||align=center|  ||  ||align=center|  ||align=center| 
|-
|scope="row"| Alberta Beach || Lac Ste. Anne County ||align=center|  ||  ||align=center|  ||align=center| 
|-
|scope="row"| Alix || Lacombe County ||align=center|  ||  ||align=center|  ||align=center| 
|-
|scope="row"| Alliance || Flagstaff County  ||align=center|  ||  ||align=center|  ||align=center| 
|-
|scope="row"| Amisk || Provost No. 52,  of ||align=center|  ||  ||align=center|  ||align=center| 
|-
|scope="row"| Andrew || Lamont County ||align=center|  ||  ||align=center|  ||align=center| 
|-
|scope="row"| Arrowwood || Vulcan County ||align=center|  ||  ||align=center|  ||align=center| 
|-
|scope="row"| Barnwell || Taber,  of ||align=center|  ||  ||align=center|  ||align=center| 
|-
|scope="row"| Barons || Lethbridge County ||align=center|  ||  ||align=center|  ||align=center| 
|-
|scope="row"| Bawlf || Camrose County ||align=center|  ||  ||align=center|  ||align=center| 
|-
|scope="row"| Beiseker || Rocky View County ||align=center|  ||  ||align=center|  ||align=center| 
|-
|scope="row"| Berwyn || Peace No. 135,  of ||align=center|  ||  ||align=center|  ||align=center| 
|-
|scope="row"| Big Valley || Stettler No. 6, County of ||align=center|  ||  ||align=center|  ||align=center| 
|-
|scope="row"| Bittern Lake || Camrose County ||align=center|  ||  ||align=center|  ||align=center| 
|-
|scope="row"| Boyle || Athabasca County ||align=center|  ||  ||align=center|  ||align=center| 
|-
|scope="row"| Breton || Brazeau County ||align=center|  ||  ||align=center|  ||align=center| 
|-
|scope="row"| Carbon || Kneehill County ||align=center|  ||  ||align=center|  ||align=center| 
|-
|scope="row"| Carmangay || Vulcan County ||align=center|  ||  ||align=center|  ||align=center| 
|-
|scope="row"| Caroline || Clearwater County ||align=center|  ||  ||align=center|  ||align=center| 
|-
|scope="row"| Champion || Vulcan County ||align=center|  ||  ||align=center|  ||align=center| 
|-
|scope="row"| Chauvin || Wainwright No. 61,  of ||align=center|  ||  ||align=center|  ||align=center| 
|-
|scope="row"| Chipman || Lamont County ||align=center|  ||  ||align=center|  ||align=center| 
|-
|scope="row"| Clive || Lacombe County ||align=center|  ||  ||align=center|  ||align=center| 
|-
|scope="row"| Clyde || Westlock County ||align=center|  ||  ||align=center|  ||align=center| 
|-
|scope="row"| Consort || Special Area No. 4 ||align=center|  ||  ||align=center|  ||align=center| 
|-
|scope="row"| Coutts || Warner No. 5, County of ||align=center|  ||  ||align=center|  ||align=center| 
|-
|scope="row"| Cowley || Pincher Creek No. 9,  of ||align=center|  ||  ||align=center|  ||align=center| 
|-
|scope="row"| Cremona || Mountain View County ||align=center|  ||  ||align=center|  ||align=center| 
|-
|scope="row"| Czar || Provost No. 52,  of ||align=center|  ||  ||align=center|  ||align=center| 
|-
|scope="row"| Delburne || Red Deer County ||align=center|  ||  ||align=center|  ||align=center| 
|-
|scope="row"| Delia || Starland County ||align=center|  ||  ||align=center|  ||align=center| 
|-
|scope="row"| Donalda || Stettler No. 6, County of ||align=center|  ||  ||align=center|  ||align=center| 
|-
|scope="row"| Donnelly || Smoky River No. 130,  of ||align=center|  ||  ||align=center|  ||align=center| 
|-
|scope="row"| Duchess || Newell, County of ||align=center|  ||  ||align=center|  ||align=center| 
|-
|scope="row"| Edberg || Camrose County ||align=center|  ||  ||align=center|  ||align=center| 
|-
|scope="row"| Edgerton || Wainwright No. 61,  of  ||align=center|  ||  ||align=center|  ||align=center| 
|-
|scope="row"| Elnora || Red Deer County ||align=center|  ||  ||align=center|  ||align=center| 
|-
|scope="row"| Empress || Special Area No. 2 ||align=center|  ||  ||align=center|  ||align=center| 
|-
|scope="row"| Foremost || Forty Mile No. 8, County of ||align=center|  ||  ||align=center|  ||align=center| 
|-
|scope="row"| Forestburg || Flagstaff County ||align=center|  ||  ||align=center|  ||align=center| 
|-
|scope="row"| Girouxville || Smoky River No. 130,  of ||align=center|  ||  ||align=center|  ||align=center| 
|-
|scope="row"| Glendon || Bonnyville No. 87,  of ||align=center|  ||  ||align=center|  ||align=center| 
|-
|scope="row"| Glenwood || Cardston County ||align=center|  ||  ||align=center|  ||align=center| 
|-
|scope="row"| Halkirk || Paintearth No. 18, County of ||align=center|  ||  ||align=center|  ||align=center| 
|-
|scope="row"| Hay Lakes || Camrose County ||align=center|  ||  ||align=center|  ||align=center| 
|-
|scope="row"| Heisler || Flagstaff County ||align=center|  ||  ||align=center|  ||align=center| 
|-
|scope="row"| Hill Spring || Cardston County ||align=center|  ||  ||align=center|  ||align=center| 
|-
|scope="row"| Hines Creek || Clear Hills County ||align=center|  ||  ||align=center|  ||align=center| 
|-
|scope="row"| Holden || Beaver County ||align=center|  ||  ||align=center|  ||align=center| 
|-
|scope="row"| Hughenden || Provost No. 52,  of ||align=center|  ||  ||align=center|  ||align=center| 
|-
|scope="row"| Hussar || Wheatland County ||align=center|  ||  ||align=center|  ||align=center| 
|-
|scope="row"| Innisfree || Minburn No. 27, County of ||align=center|  ||  ||align=center|  ||align=center| 
|-
|scope="row"| Irma || Wainwright No. 61,  of ||align=center|  ||  ||align=center|  ||align=center| 
|-
|scope="row"| Kitscoty || Vermilion River, County of ||align=center|  ||  ||align=center|  ||align=center| 
|-
|scope="row"| Linden || Kneehill County ||align=center|  ||  ||align=center|  ||align=center| 
|-
|scope="row"| Lomond || Vulcan County ||align=center|  ||  ||align=center|  ||align=center| 
|-
|scope="row"| Longview || Foothills County ||align=center|  ||  ||align=center|  ||align=center| 
|-
|scope="row"| Lougheed || Flagstaff County ||align=center|  ||  ||align=center|  ||align=center| 
|-
|scope="row"| Mannville || Minburn No. 27, County of ||align=center|  ||  ||align=center|  ||align=center| 
|-
|scope="row"| Marwayne || Vermilion River, County of ||align=center|  ||  ||align=center|  ||align=center| 
|-
|scope="row"| Milo || Vulcan County ||align=center|  ||  ||align=center|  ||align=center| 
|-
|scope="row"| Morrin || Starland County ||align=center|  ||  ||align=center|  ||align=center| 
|-
|scope="row"| Munson || Starland County ||align=center|  ||  ||align=center|  ||align=center| 
|-
|scope="row"| Myrnam || Two Hills No. 21, County of ||align=center|  ||  ||align=center|  ||align=center| 
|-
|scope="row"| Nampa || Northern Sunrise County ||align=center|  ||  ||align=center|  ||align=center| 
|-
|scope="row"| Paradise Valley || Vermilion River, County of ||align=center|  ||  ||align=center|  ||align=center| 
|-
|scope="row"| Rockyford || Wheatland County ||align=center|  ||  ||align=center|  ||align=center| 
|-
|scope="row"| Rosalind || Camrose County ||align=center|  ||  ||align=center|  ||align=center| 
|-
|scope="row"| Rosemary || Newell, County of ||align=center|  ||  ||align=center|  ||align=center| 
|-
|scope="row"| Rycroft || Spirit River No. 133,  of ||align=center|  ||  ||align=center|  ||align=center| 
|-
|scope="row"| Ryley || Beaver County ||align=center|  ||  ||align=center|  ||align=center| 
|-
|scope="row"| Spring Lake || Parkland County ||align=center|  ||  ||align=center|  ||align=center| 
|-
|scope="row"| Standard || Wheatland County ||align=center|  ||  ||align=center|  ||align=center| 
|-
|scope="row"| Stirling || Warner No. 5, County of ||align=center|  ||  ||align=center|  ||align=center| 
|-
|scope="row"| Veteran || Special Area No. 4 ||align=center|  ||  ||align=center|  ||align=center| 
|-
|scope="row"| Vilna || Smoky Lake County ||align=center|  ||  ||align=center|  ||align=center| 
|-
|scope="row"| Warburg || Leduc County ||align=center|  ||  ||align=center|  ||align=center| 
|-
|scope="row"| Warner || Warner No. 5, County of ||align=center|  ||  ||align=center|  ||align=center| 
|-
|scope="row"| Waskatenau || Smoky Lake County ||align=center|  ||  ||align=center|  ||align=center| 
|-
|scope="row"| Youngstown || Special Area No. 3 ||align=center|  ||  ||align=center|  ||align=center| 
|- class="sortbottom" align="center" style="background: #f2f2f2;"
| Total villages
|align=center| —
|align=center| —
| 
|align=center| 
| 
|- class="sortbottom" align="center" style="background: #f2f2f2;"
|}
Notes:

Village status eligibility 

Numerous Alberta hamlets meet the minimum population requirement for village status eligibility.

Town status eligibility 
The villages of Duchess and Alberta Beach are currently eligible for town status having populations of 1,085 and 1,018.

Former villages 
Of Alberta's 100 former urban municipalities communities, 81 of them were former villages prior to being dissolved, annexed, or amalgamated.

See also 
List of census divisions of Alberta
List of cities in Alberta
List of communities in Alberta
List of hamlets in Alberta
List of municipal districts in Alberta
List of municipalities in Alberta
List of summer villages in Alberta
List of towns in Alberta

References

External links 
 Alberta First - Alberta communities (information and statistics)
 Alberta Municipal Affairs
 Alberta Urban Municipalities Association
The Development of Local Government in Alberta

 
Villages